Rabbi Yochanan Zweig is the Rosh Yeshiva of Talmudic University of Florida / Yeshiva V'Kollel Beis Moshe Chaim of Miami Beach. Under his auspices is also a high school and elementary school, both located in Miami Beach.

Biography

Rabbi Zweig was raised in Philadelphia.

While attending Ner Israel Rabbinical College from 1955–1969, Rabbi Zweig received rabbinical ordination (Yoreh Yoreh and Yadin Yadin) from Rabbi Yaakov Yitzchak Ruderman and Rabbi Yaakov Weinberg. Rabbi Zweig then went to Israel as a lecturer at Bais HaTalmud in Jerusalem where he remained for six years. In 1974 Rabbi Zweig moved to Miami Beach, FL and opened the Talmudic University of Florida/Yeshiva V'Kollel Beis Moshe Chaim, Alfred and Sayde Swire College of Judaic Studies. It is one of largest Yeshiva and Kollel in the Greater Miami area.

Rabbi Zweig received his formal education from Johns Hopkins University and went on to pursue a J.D. from the University of Maryland School of Law. Subsequently, he has completed a master's degree and Ph.D. in Talmudic Law from the Ner Israel Rabbinical College in Baltimore, Md.

Publications
 Metzulos Yam, Treatises on Bava Basra (Property Law)
 Shiras Yam, Biblical studies on Bereishis (Genesis)
 Shiras Yam, Volume 2
Biblical studies on Shemos (Exodus)

References

1942 births
American Haredi rabbis
Living people
Haredi rosh yeshivas